Flutter is a 2011 British black comedy film about gambling, written by Stephen Leslie and directed by Giles Borg.  The film stars Joe Anderson, Ricky Tomlinson, Laura Fraser, Billy Zane, Anna Anissimova and Mark Williams.

Cast
 Joe Anderson as John 
 Laura Fraser as Helen 
 Luke Evans as Adrian 
 Max Brown as Wagner 
 Anton Lesser as Bruno 
 Billy Zane as Edwin "The Dentist" 
 Mark Williams as Raymond 
 Ricky Tomlinson
 Anna Anissimova as Stan 
 Autumn Federici as Nancy
 Richard Reid as Winston
 John Raine as Terry

Production
As of February 2010, Park Entertainment begun principal photography in filming northeast England, and began shopping the title to buyers in Berlin.  Filming was completed in six weeks.

References

External links
 
  Park Entertainment projects 

2011 films
British black comedy films
Films shot in England
British films about gambling
2011 black comedy films
2010s English-language films
2010s British films